Elachista agilis is a moth of the family Elachistidae. It is found in Canada, where it has been recorded from Alberta and Montana.

The wingspan is about 7 mm. The forewings are dark brown, somewhat shining, with metallic silvery or golden markings. The hindwings are brownish grey.

References

agilis
Moths described in 1921
Moths of North America